Robert Alexander Handcock (6 April 1874 – 27 January 1956) was a New Zealand rugby union player who represented the All Blacks in 1897. His position of choice was forward. Handcock did not play in any test matches as New Zealand did not play their first until 1903.

He was born in Auckland in 1874.

He died in Auckland in 1956.

Career 
Although he was listed as a forward Handcock mainly played as a Hooker.

He initially played for the Grafton club but then switched to the Parnell club. It was here Handcock made the Auckland provincial side debuting in 1896. He made 3 appearances.

In those three games and after appearing in the inaugural North against South Island match Handcock was selected for an 11-match tour of Australia.

He played in eight of the matches where he scored three tries.

He had a 6-year absence from first-class rugby until 1903, where he made one final appearance for the Auckland union.

Although he had an unusual playing career in those days it wasn't uncommon to have more caps for their country than a provincial side.

References 

1874 births
1956 deaths
New Zealand rugby union players
New Zealand international rugby union players
Rugby union hookers
Rugby union players from Auckland